Víctor Eduardo Bignon Guzmán (7 September 1925 – 27 October 2007) was a Chilean boxer. He competed in the men's heavyweight event at the 1948 Summer Olympics. At the 1948 Summer Olympics, he lost to Adam Faul of Canada.

References

1925 births
2007 deaths
Chilean male boxers
Olympic boxers of Chile
Boxers at the 1948 Summer Olympics
Pan American Games medalists in boxing
Pan American Games silver medalists for Chile
Boxers at the 1951 Pan American Games
Heavyweight boxers
Medalists at the 1951 Pan American Games
20th-century Chilean people